Bhumsara is a village in Gopalganj District, Bangladesh, part of Muksudpur Upazila and Bhabrasur Union.

References

Populated places in Dhaka Division